Sphaerolobium pulchellum is a species of flowering plant in the family Fabaceae and is endemic to the south-west of Western Australia.

Sphaerolobium pulchellum was first formally described in 1855 by Carl Meissner in the journal Botanische Zeitung from specimens collected by James Drummond. The specific epithet (pulchellum) means "beautiful and small".

This grows in sand and gravel on plains in the Geraldton Sandplains and Swan Coastal Plain bioregions of south-western Western Australia and is listed as "not threatened" by the Government of Western Australia Department of Biodiversity, Conservation and Attractions.

References

External links 
 Sphaerolobium pulchellum: occurrence data from the Australasian Virtual Herbarium

Taxa named by Carl Meissner
Plants described in 1855
pulchellum
Fabales of Australia
Eudicots of Western Australia